Henley discontinued events are discontinued rowing events at the annual Henley Royal Regatta on the River Thames at Henley-on-Thames in England.

Events

Town Challenge Cup

Prince Philip Challenge Cup

District Challenge Cup

Winners

Public Schools Challenge Cup

Winners

Presentation Cup

Winners

District Goblets

Winners

Special Race for Schools

Winners

Silver Wherry

Winners

Women's Invitation Coxed Fours

Winners

Women's Invitation Double Sculls

Winners

References

Events at Henley Royal Regatta